Ica District is one of fourteen districts of the province of Ica in region of Ica within Peru.

The Province capital city of Ica is located in this district. Ica is also the capital of the entire Region of Ica.  Also, close by is the tourist oasis village of Huacachina.

See also 

 Administrative divisions of Peru

References

External links